Lawrence Betts (4 August 1904 – 28 April 1984) was a South African sprinter. He competed in three events at the 1924 Summer Olympics.

References

External links
 

1904 births
1984 deaths
South African male sprinters
Athletes (track and field) at the 1924 Summer Olympics
Olympic athletes of South Africa
Sportspeople from Pretoria
Transvaal Colony people